Alain Bernheim  (October 5, 1922 – October 2, 2009) was a French-born American film producer and literary agent whose film credits include Buddy Buddy and Racing with the Moon. He died on October 2, 2009, at age 86.

References

External links

1922 births
2009 deaths
American film producers
French emigrants to the United States